"I Need You" is a song written by Eric Carmen. Versions by Euclid Beach Band (1979) and then 3T (1996) were released as singles.

Early versions
"I Need You" was originally recorded in 1977 by Frankie Valli on his album Lady Put the Light Out. Euclid Beach Band released their version as a single in 1979 which reached No. 81 on the U.S. Billboard Hot 100.  Carmen provided keyboard and production work on the song. The lead vocalist is Peter Hewlett.

3T version

The song was covered by American R&B group 3T in 1996, released as the fifth single from their debut album, Brotherhood (1995). It had a very good performance on the European charts, but was never released in the US. Michael Jackson, their uncle, provides background vocals, and is sometimes credited as a featured artist.

Critical reception
A reviewer from Music Week rated the song four out of five, adding, "Uncle Michael provides backing vocals on this ballad which sends 3T harmonising down the schmaltz road via an arrangement oddly reminiscent of East 17's Stay Another Day."

Track listings
 CD single
 "I Need You" (Album Version) – 3:55
 "Brotherhood" (Single Edit) – 3:16

 CD maxi
 "I Need You" (Christmas Mix) – 4:13
 "I Need You" (Singalong Version) – 3:55
 "Anything" (Acoustic Version) – 4:02

 CD maxi (2)
 "I Need You" (Album Version) – 3:55 
 "I Need You" (Linslee Campbell Remix) – 5:27 
 "I Need You" (Linsee Campbell Breakdown Remix) – 5:27 
 "Brotherhood" (Single Edit) – 3:16

Charts and certifications

Weekly charts

Year-end charts

Certifications

Disco Stewie Harrison version

The song was covered by Australian dance group Disco Stewie Harrison, featuring Roma Waterman in 2005. The song peaked at number 21 on the Australian charts.

Track listing
 "I Need You" (Dance Mix) - 3:32
 "I Need You" (Love Mix) - 3:30

Charts

References

External links
 
 
 

1977 songs
1979 singles
1996 singles
2005 singles
Frankie Valli songs
3T songs
Michael Jackson songs
Songs written by Eric Carmen
Song recordings produced by Denniz Pop
Song recordings produced by Max Martin
Epic Records singles
Pop ballads
Contemporary R&B ballads